Marcel Dalio (born Marcel Benoit Blauschild; 23 November 1899 in Paris – 18 November 1983) was a French movie actor. He had major roles in two films directed by Jean Renoir, La Grande Illusion (1937) and The Rules of the Game (1939).

Life and career

Early life in France
Dalio was born Marcel Benoit Blauschild in Paris to Romanian-Jewish immigrant parents. He trained at the Paris Conservatoire and performed in revues from 1920. Dalio appeared in stage plays from the 1920s and acted in French films in the 1930s. His first big film success was in Julien Duvivier's Pépé le Moko (1937). He followed them with two films for Jean Renoir, La Grande Illusion (1937) and The Rules of the Game (La Règle du jeu, 1939).

After divorcing his first wife, Jany Holt, he married the young actress Madeleine Lebeau in 1939.

Wartime exile
In June 1940, Dalio and Lebeau left Paris ahead of the invading German army and reached Lisbon. They are presumed to have received transit visas from Aristides de Sousa Mendes, allowing them to enter Spain and journey on to Portugal. It took them two months to get visas to Chile. However, when their ship, the S.S. Quanza, stopped in Mexico, they were stranded (along with around 200 other passengers) when the Chilean visas they had purchased turned out to be forgeries. Eventually they were able to get temporary Canadian passports and entered the United States. Meanwhile, the advancing German Nazi army in occupied France used posters of his face as a representative of "a typical Jew". All other members of Dalio's family died in Nazi concentration camps.

In Hollywood, although Dalio was never quite able to regain the profile he had in France, he appeared in 19 American films during the Second World War, in stereotypical roles as a Frenchman. Dalio's first film in the United States was the Fred MacMurray comedy One Night in Lisbon (1941) in which he portrayed a hotel concierge. Around the same time, he appeared in the Edward G. Robinson film Unholy Nights and the Gene Tierney film The Shanghai Gesture (also 1941). He remained busy, appearing in Flight Lieutenant (1942) starring Pat O'Brien and Glenn Ford. Dalio next portrayed a Frenchman, Focquet, in the film The Pied Piper (also 1942). In this film, Monty Woolley portrayed an Englishman trying to get out of France with an ever-increasing number of children ahead of the German invasion. Dalio then appeared among the star-studded cast in Tales of Manhattan (both 1942).

In the uncredited role of Emil the croupier in Casablanca (also 1942), he appeared in the scene when Captain Renault closes down Rick's Cafe American using the pretext, "I am shocked, shocked to find that gambling is going on in here!", Emil approaches him and hands him his usual bribe money saying, "Your winnings sir", while Rick darts Emil a flabbergasted look. His wife Madeleine Lebeau was also in the film, playing Yvonne, Rick's intermittent girlfriend. On 22 June, while Lebeau was filming her scenes with Hans Twardowski as the German officer, Dalio filed for divorce in Los Angeles on the grounds of desertion.

He was cast in some larger roles, for example in the war dramas Tonight We Raid Calais and Paris After Dark (both 1943), in the latter his ex-wife Lebeau also appeared. Dalio played a French policeman in The Song of Bernadette (also 1943). His penultimate wartime role in an American film was in the adaptation of To Have and Have Not (1944) reuniting him with Humphrey Bogart.

Postwar
When the war in Europe ended in May 1945, Dalio returned to France to continue his movie career. His first appearance that year was in Her Final Role (Son dernier rôle, 1946). He appeared in ten more movies in France and one in England through the late 1940s. He played Captain Nikarescu in Black Jack (1950).

Dalio appeared in four American movies in the mid-1950s. Gentlemen Prefer Blondes starring Jane Russell and Marilyn Monroe and Flight to Tangier (both 1953) starring Joan Fontaine, Lucky Me starring Doris Day and Sabrina (both 1954) starring Bogart and Audrey Hepburn. In Sabrina, the bearded Dalio played one of Hepburn's fellow cooking students in Paris. He then briefly returned to France.

Dalio portrayed the Claude Rains character, Captain Renault, in the short-lived television series Casablanca (1955). Dalio had the role of a French sergeant in the war drama Jump into Hell (also 1955) about the French defeat at the Battle of Dien Bien Phu in Vietnam. Dalio appeared in the musical comedy Ten Thousand Bedrooms starring Dean Martin, with Paul Henreid in the supporting cast. He also appeared as a French priest in a war movie, again about the French involvement in Vietnam, called China Gate which features the acting of Nat King Cole. Finally that year, Dalio played Zizi in The Sun Also Rises (all 1957) his third movie based on an Ernest Hemingway novel, this time starring Tyrone Power and Ava Gardner. Over the next four years, he appeared in Lafayette Escadrille, The Perfect Furlough (both 1958) starring Tony Curtis, The Man Who Understood Women starring Henry Fonda, Pillow Talk (both 1959) starring Rock Hudson and Doris Day, Can-Can (1960) starring Frank Sinatra and The Devil at 4 O'Clock (1961) starring Sinatra and Spencer Tracy.

After making more movies in France, Dalio received a major supporting role in the mystery The List of Adrian Messenger (1963), set entirely in England but filmed primarily in Hollywood. Two of Dalio's previous co-stars, Tony Curtis and Frank Sinatra, had cameos in the film. This was followed with the part of Father Cluzeot in the John Wayne movie, Donovan's Reef (also 1963). After appearing again with Tony Curtis in Wild and Wonderful (1964), Dalio returned to France. He continued making movies for Hollywood, but he also appeared in many French productions.

Later movies featuring Dalio include Lady L (1965) starring Sophia Loren and Paul Newman, How to Steal a Million (1966) starring Audrey Hepburn and Peter O'Toole and How Sweet It Is! (1968) starring Debbie Reynolds and James Garner. In Mike Nichols' Catch-22 Dalio played the old Italian living in the whorehouse, while he also appeared in The Great White Hope (both 1970) with James Earl Jones. From then on, he did movies almost entirely in France, the best known of them being The Mad Adventures of Rabbi Jacob (1973) and La Bête (1975) directed by Walerian Borowczyk. His last appearance was in a TV movie portraying Lord Exeter in Les Longuelune (1982).

Television 
Dalio also appeared in numerous television shows both in the United States (between 1954 and 1963) and in France (1968 to 1981). These include guest appearances in Alfred Hitchcock Presents, Peter Gunn, 77 Sunset Strip, Maverick (in "Game of Chance" with James Garner and Jack Kelly), Alcoa Presents: One Step Beyond and Ben Casey.

Dalio married Hollywood based French journalist Madeleine [Alena] Prime in Los Angeles, in 1981.

Dalio, who appeared in almost 150 movies, died in Paris on 18 November 1983, just 5 days shy of his 84th birthday. He is buried in Cimetière parisien de Montrouge in Hauts de Seine, France.

Selected filmography 

 Olive passager clandestin (1931) – Caravanos
 The Night at the Hotel (1932) – Jérôme
 Les affaires publiques (1934) – Le speaker / Le sculpteur / Le capitaine des pompiers / L'amiral
 Turandot, Princess of China (1935) – Hippolyte
 Return to Paradise (1935) – Le notaire
 Le golem (1936) – (uncredited)
 Quand minuit sonnera (1936)
 Beethoven's Great Love (1936) – L'éditeur Steiner
 Pépé le Moko (1937) – L'Arbi
 White Cargo (1937) – Pérez
 L'Homme à abattre (1937)
 Marthe Richard, au service de la France (1937) – Pedro
 The Pearls of the Crown (1937) – Le ministre d'Abyssinie
 La Grande Illusion (1937) – Le lieutenant Rosenthal
 Sarati the Terrible (1937) – Benoît
 The Kiss of Fire (1937) – Le photographe
 Miarka (1937) – Le maire
 Rail Pirates (1938) – Le mercenaire
 Mollenard (1938) – Happy Jones
  (1938) – Le donneur
 La Maison du Maltais (1938) – Matteo Gordina – le Maltais
 The Curtain Rises (1938) – Le jude d'instruction
 Conflict (1938) – L'usurier / The Money-Lender
 The White Slave (1939) – Le sultan Soliman
 La Tradition de minuit (1939) – Édouard Mutter, l'antiquaire
 La Règle du jeu (1939) – Marquis Robert de la Cheyniest
 Sacred Woods (1939) – Zakouskine, le danseur
 Thunder Over Paris (1940) – Barel
 One Night in Lisbon (1941) – Concierge
 Unholy Partners (1941) – Molyneaux
 The Shanghai Gesture (1941) – The Master of the Spinning Wheel
 Flight Lieutenant (1942) – Marcel Faulet (uncredited)
 The Pied Piper (1942) – Focquet
 Tales of Manhattan (1942) – 2nd Salesman at Santelli's (Fields sequence) (uncredited)
 Casablanca (1942) – Emil – Croupier at Rick's (uncredited)
 Tonight We Raid Calais (1943) – Jacques Grandet
 The Constant Nymph (1943) – Georges
 Paris After Dark (1943) – Luigi – Quisling Barber
 Flesh and Fantasy (1943) – Clown (uncredited)
 The Desert Song (1943) – Tarbouch
 The Song of Bernadette (1943) – Callet
 Action in Arabia (1944) – Chakka – Arab Henchman at Airport
 Pin Up Girl (1944) – Pierre (uncredited)
 Wilson (1944) – Premier Georges Clemenceau
 To Have and Have Not (1944) – Gérard (Frenchy)
 A Bell for Adano (1945) – Zito
 Her Final Role (1946) – Ardouin
 Pétrus (1946) – Luciani
 Temptation Harbour (1947) – Insp. Dupré
 The Damned (1947) – Larga
 Snowbound (1948) – Stefano Valdini
Judicial Error (1948) – Dinari
 Dédée d'Anvers (1948) – Marco
 Dark Sunday (1948) – Max – l'éditeur
 The Lovers Of Verona (1949) – Amedeo Maglia
 Wicked City (1949) – Aimé – un nervi
 Portrait of an Assassin (1949) – Fred dit Bébé
 Maya (1949) – Le steward
 Menace de mort (1950) – Denis
 Black Jack (1950) – Captain Nikarescu
 Oriental Port (1950) – Zarapoulos
 On the Riviera (1951) – Philippe Lebrix
 Rich, Young and Pretty (1951) – Claude Duval
 Nous irons à Monte-Carlo (1951) – Poulos – l'imprésario
 Lovely to Look At (1952) – Pierre
 The Merry Widow (1952) – Police Sergeant
 The Snows of Kilimanjaro (1952) – Emile
 The Happy Time (1952) – Grandpere Bonnard
 Gentlemen Prefer Blondes (1953) – Magistrate
 Flight to Tangier (1953) – Goro
 Monte Carlo Baby (1953) – Melissa Farrell's Agent
 Lucky Me (1954) – Anton
 La Patrouille des sables (1954) – Maillard
 Sabrina (1954) – Baron St. Fontanel
 Tres hombres van a morir (1954) – Maillard
 The Lovers of Lisbon (1955) – Porfirio
 Jump Into Hell (1955) – Sgt. Taite
 Razzia sur la chnouf (1955) – Paul Liski
 Miracle in the Rain (1956) – Marcel – Waiter
 Anything Goes (1956) – Ship's Captain (uncredited)
 Ten Thousand Bedrooms (1957) – Vittorio Cisini
 China Gate (1957) – Father Paul
 The Sun Also Rises (1957) – Zizi
 Tip on a Dead Jockey (1957) – Toto del Aro
 Lafayette Escadrille (1958) – Drill Sergeant
 The Perfect Furlough (1958) – Henri Valentin
 Alcoa Presents: One Step Beyond (10/2/1959) -Jean Gabeau, Ghost -('The Dark Room', episode)
 The Man Who Understood Women (1959) – Le Marne
 Pillow Talk (1959) – Pierot
 Can-Can (1960) – Andre – the head waiter
 Classe Tous Risques (1960) – Arthur Gibelin
 Song Without End (1960) – Chelard
 The Devil at 4 O'Clock (1961) – Gaston
 Jessica (1962) – Luigi Tuffi
 Cartouche (1962) – Malichot
 Le Petit Garçon de l'ascenseur (1962) – Antonio
 The Law of Men (1962) – L'avocat Plautet
 Le Diable et les Dix Commandements (1962) – Le bijoutier / Jeweler (segment "Luxurieux point ne seras")
 L'Abominable Homme des douanes (1963) – Gregor
 The List of Adrian Messenger (1963) – Max Karoudjian
 Donovan's Reef (1963) – Father Cluzeot
 À couteaux tirés (1964) – Jean Grégor / Gregor Veloni
 Wild and Wonderful (1964) – Dr. Reynard
 The Monocle Laughs (1964) – Elie Mayerfitsky
 Male Companion (1964) – Socratès
 Tintin and the Blue Oranges (1964) – (voice, uncredited)
 Lady L (1965) – Sapper
 Made in Paris (1966) – Georges
 Un garçon, une fille. Le dix-septième ciel (1966) – Le maître d'hôtel
 How to Steal a Million (1966) – Senor Paravideo
 Tender Scoundrel (1966) – Le père de Véronique
 The 25th Hour (1967) – Strul
 The Oldest Profession (1967) – Me Vladimir Leskov (segment "Aujourd'hui")
 How Sweet It Is! (1968) – Louis
 Du blé en liasses (1969) – Vanessian
 Justine (1969) – French Consul General
 Catch-22 (1970) – Old Man in Whorehouse
 The Great White Hope (1970) – French Promoter
 L'amour c'est gai, l'amour c'est triste (1971) – M. Paul
 Aussi loin que l'amour (1971) – Le milliardaire
 Papa les p'tits bateaux (1971) – Boudu, le clochard
 Les Yeux fermés (1972) – Le vieux monsieur
 La punition (1973) – Le Libanais
 The Mad Adventures of Rabbi Jacob (1973) – Rabbi Jacob
 Ursule et Grelu (1974) – Le réceptionniste
 Dédé la tendresse (1974)
 La Bête (1975) – Duc Rammendelo De Balo
 Let Joy Reign Supreme (1975) – Le noble suffocant au repas (uncredited)
 Trop c'est trop (1975) – Saint-Pierre
 La chatte sur un doigt brûlant (1975) – Hector Franbourgeois
 Le faux-cul (1975) – Cohen
 Hard Love (1975) – Le maître d'hôtel
 The Wing or the Thigh (1976) – Le tailleur de Duchemin
 Solemn Communion (1977) – Old Charles Gravet
 Shadow of the Castles (1977) – Père Renard
 L'Honorable Société (1978) – Marcel
 One Page of Love (1978) – Le père de Fanny
 Surprise Sock (1978) – Monsieur L'église
 Le paradis des riches (1978) – Mathieu
 Brigade mondaine: Vaudou aux Caraïbes (1980) – Mazoyer

References

External links

 
 
 
 
 

1899 births
1983 deaths
French Ashkenazi Jews
Male actors from Paris
French male film actors
French male television actors
Jewish French male actors
French people of Romanian-Jewish descent
Burials at the Cimetière parisien de Bagneux
20th-century French male actors
French expatriate male actors in the United States